Naoura    (also  Noura) is a village in Akkar Governorate, Lebanon.

The population  is mostly  Sunni Muslim.

History
In 1838, Eli Smith noted  the place as en-Naura,  located east of esh-Sheikh Mohammed. The  inhabitants were  Alawites and Isma'ilites.

References

Bibliography

External links
 Naoura, Localiban 

Populated places in Akkar District
Sunni Muslim communities in Lebanon